Charles Goodall Lee (1881 – 1973) was an American dentist, and the first licensed Chinese American dentist in California. Lee financed the building of the Chinese American Citizens Alliance lodge in Oakland, California. He graduated from the School of Dentistry at University of the Pacific.

Lee was born in 1881 in San Francisco, California to Lee Tong Hay, a lay leader of the forming Chinese Methodist Church associated with Otis Gibson's missions that would become the Chinese Community United Methodist Church.

After the 1906 San Francisco earthquake Lee relocated to San Jose, California then settling in Oakland becoming Oakland Chinatown's first dentist. His practice continued until his retirement in 1940. He was an active participant in civil affairs founding Oakland's Chinese American Citizens Alliance in 1912. Lee was also a lay leader of the Chinese Community Methodist Church of Oakland, a member of the Oakland Chinese Center and a member of the Lee Family Benevolent Association.

He was married to Clara Elizabeth Chan who was the first Chinese American woman to register to vote in the United States.

He is interred in Oakland.

Activism
In 1912, Lee became one of six men who founded the Chinese American Citizens Alliance (C.A.C.A) Oakland Lodge (members including Chew Keung, Wong W. Kai, Jow Pong and Chancey Chan). The organization was formally named Native Sons of the Golden State, but after the earthquake of 1906 some members moved across the Bay to Oakland where there was a growing number of Chinese Americans. All of the founding men took the opportunity to purchase a building for the organization by each placing a deposit down for the headquarters. Complications arose after purchasing the building when the previous tenants required the members to pay “remodeling fees” before they were able to move in. So, all the members proceeded to pay for these repair fees with their own money, as well still coming together to buy the building. Lee contributed the largest payment for the purchasing of the building as well as the repair fees. As a member of the Oakland Lodge, Lee fought for the civil rights, equal economical and political opportunities, and the general welfare of Chinese Americans.

Lee Benevolent Association
Lee and his wife, Elizabeth, were also members of the Lee Family Benevolent Association. They were formed in the 1800s as social service organizations for new immigrants, based on their last names, which signify their home villages in China. Now, they're very politically powerful; the Chinese Six Companies, one of the city's oldest benevolent organizations, serves as an umbrella organization for all the family groups. The Lee Family Benevolent Association is responsible for swearing in the first Chinese American mayor of San Francisco.

Chinese Community Methodist Church
Lee became a lay leader in the church after he set up his dental practice in the early 1900s. Charles' father-in-law, Chan Hon, was a reverend at the church; his father, Lee Tong Hay, was also a reverend. The church was originally established for schools and to help women escape slavery and prostitution; now, the organization serves as a religious worshipping place for Chinese Americans in Oakland. The Lees become known to exemplify the Chinese Community Methodist Church's tradition of community involvement and social justice.

References

 Yung, Judy (1995). "Unbound Feet, A Social History of Chinese Women in San Francisco". University of California Press
 Armentrout, Eve and Ma, Jeong Huei (1982). "The Chinese of Oakland, Unsung Builders".
 Wong, William (2004). "Images of America, Oakland's Chinatown". Arcadia Press.
 Christina Yu (2017). "Brief History of Oakland Lodge"
 Chinese Community UMC (2017). "Clara Elizabeth & Charles Goodall Lee"
 Heather Knight (2011). "Lee's Family Association: A Chinatown Powerhouse"

Chinese-American history
American dentists
1881 births
1973 deaths
Activists from San Francisco
University of the Pacific (United States) alumni
American Methodist clergy
20th-century dentists
Methodists from California
American people of Chinese descent